William Martin Shipke (November 18, 1882 – September 10, 1940) was a Major League Baseball third baseman who played for four seasons. He played for the Cleveland Naps in 1906 and the Washington Senators from 1907 to 1909.

External links

1882 births
1940 deaths
Major League Baseball third basemen
Cleveland Naps players
Washington Senators (1901–1960) players
Baseball players from Missouri
Minor league baseball managers
Springfield Reds players
Fort Scott Giants players
Omaha Rangers players
Omaha Rourkes players
Des Moines Champs players
Huron Packers players